A. S. Nathaniel (died 2013) was a Pakistani nurse who served Muhammad Ali Jinnah in his last days at Ziarat residency. She was recruited in 1938 in the Health Department and was specially debuted to attend to Jinnah in 1948. She retired in 1980. In 2000, Ms Nathaniel received a Tamgha-i-Imtiaz for her services by former Pakistani President Rafique Tarrar. She died on October 6, 2013, and is buried at the Christian Cemetery at Jail Road, Lahore.

Personal life
She was married to Salas Nathaniel and had three children, namely, Dr Victor Nathaniel, Dr Maureen Christy Munir and Keith Sadiq Nathaniel. 
She was a practicing Christian.

References

2013 deaths
Year of birth missing
Pakistani nurses
Pakistani Christians
Pakistani women
Recipients of Tamgha-e-Imtiaz
People from Quetta